Habe may refer to :

Places
Habé, Burkina Faso
Deba Habe, Nigeria
Dimbal Habe, Mali
Lessagou Habe, Mali

People
Hans Habe (1911-1977), pen name of János Békessy, Hungarian-Austrian writer and newspaper publisher who also held U.S. citizenship
Marina Elizabeth Habe (1951-1968), daughter of Hans Habe
Tadashige Habe (1916-2001), Japanese malacologist